Man from God's Country is a 1958 American CinemaScope Western film. It was written by George Waggner (credited as "george waGGner"), directed by Paul Landres and starred George Montgomery and Randy Stuart.

Plot
Dan Beattie gives up his job to move further west and rejoin his old war buddy Curt Warren in the town of Sundown. At first mistaken for a railroad agent by Beau Santee, a Sundown businessman who wants to keep the railroad away from his town, Dan is nearly killed by Santee's henchman, Mark Faber. Dan discovers that his old pal Curt works for Santee. Even after learning Dan's true identity, Santee considers him trouble and plots to get rid of him. With the help of Curt's son Stony, Dan tries to get Curt to take a stand on the right side of the law.

Cast
 George Montgomery as Dan Beattie 
 Randy Stuart as Nancy Dawson
 Gregg Barton as Colonel Miller 
 Kim Charney as Stoney Warren
 Susan Cummings as Mary Jo Ellis 
 James Griffith as Mark Faber 
 House Peters Jr. as Curt Warren 
 Phillip Terry as Sheriff 
 Frank Wilcox as Beau Santee 
 Al Wyatt Sr. as Henchman (as Al Wyatt)

See also
 List of American films of 1958

References

External links

1958 films
1958 Western (genre) films
American Western (genre) films
Films directed by Paul Landres
Allied Artists films
CinemaScope films
1950s English-language films
1950s American films